Yohan Demont (born 15 May 1978) is a French former professional footballer who played as right-back or right midfielder. Following spells at AS Beauvais and AC Ajaccio, he spent most of his career at RC Lens.

Career
Out of a contract at the end of 2012–13 season, Demont agreed to stay at RC Lens to play for the reserves.

Honours
Beauvais
 Championnat National: 2000

Lens
 UEFA Intertoto Cup: 2005

References

External links
 
 Lens profile 

1978 births
Living people
Sportspeople from Valenciennes
French footballers
Footballers from Hauts-de-France
Association football fullbacks
Association football midfielders
Ligue 1 players
Ligue 2 players
Championnat National players
Championnat National 2 players
AS Beauvais Oise players
AC Ajaccio players
RC Lens players
French football managers